Alexander Grigoryevich Varnek (born St. Petersburg, 1782 - died 1843) was a Russian painter, noted for his portraits of Russian society figures.

Biography
He was a pupil of Dmitry Levitzky and Stepan Shchukin at the Imperial Academy of Arts. He went abroad (1801–1809) as a representative of the Academy and later returned as professor and advisor.

Along with other artists of the period, Varnek was somewhat restricted in his choice of subject matter due to the political climate and censorship that operated, especially during the reign of Nicholas I. Under censorship, artists were expected to be complacent about the conditions of Russian life. Patrons who commissioned work rarely strayed from acceptable religious and historical themes while artists who chose their own subjects tended to confine themselves to "safe themes."  Thus, Varnek's specialty became portraiture.

In his own lifetime, he was regarded as a "celebrity artist."

Work

He was particularly noted for his masterful drawing, his harmonious, if not particularly vivid coloring, the ability to capture a close resemblance, appropriate lighting, and in general for his conscientious execution without embellishment. Contemporaries highly rated his portraits, consequently he created many works of this sort. Particularly striking are his many portraits; a portrait of Madame Khatova (the wife of General Alexander Ilich Khatov), a life-size portrait of Count Alexander Stroganov, a portrait of the former president of the Academy, Alexey Olenin, and the paintings "Head of a Young Turk", "Boy with Dog", and "Fiddler". In addition, Varnek painted icons representing the Annunciation and the Four Evangelists. These latter are in the chapel of the Academy of Arts.

Selected portraits

References

Further reading 

СТАРАТЕЛЬ, Русская живопись: Biography (in Russian)

19th-century painters from the Russian Empire
Russian male painters
Painters from Saint Petersburg
1782 births
1843 deaths
Orientalist painters
19th-century male artists from the Russian Empire
Imperial Academy of Arts alumni
Members of the Imperial Academy of Arts
Awarded with a large gold medal of the Academy of Arts
Burials at Tikhvin Cemetery